John Wells "Mike" Farley (June 15, 1878 – March 12, 1959) was an American college football player and coach, lawyer, newspaper publisher, and civic leader. He served as the head coach at the University of Maine in 1901 and 1903 and at Harvard University in 1902, compiling a career college football record of 23–5. In 1901, Farley achieved a 7–1 record and gave Maine its first-ever conference championship, winning the Maine Intercollegiate Athletic Association (MIAA). His record of 5–3 in 1903 also earned the Black Bears a third straight MIAA championship. The team won a conference title under Eddie N. Robinson in his only season as head coach in 1902.

Farley was born in Brookline, Massachusetts. He graduated from Harvard College in 1899 and Harvard Law School in 1903. Farley practiced with law with the firm of Herrick, Smith, Donald, Farley & Ketchum in Boston. In 1910, he became publisher and treasurer of the Boston Herald. He later served as president of Boston Children's Hospital and founded the Children's Medical Center. Farley died on March 12, 1959, in Needham, Massachusetts.

Head coaching record

See also
 List of college football head coaches with non-consecutive tenure

References

1878 births
1959 deaths
20th-century American newspaper publishers (people)
American football ends
American hospital administrators
Boston Herald people
Harvard Crimson football coaches
Harvard Crimson football players
Maine Black Bears football coaches
Harvard Law School alumni
Lawyers from Boston
Sportspeople from Brookline, Massachusetts
Players of American football from Massachusetts
Coaches of American football from Massachusetts